Robert W. Williams Jr. (January 24, 1841 in Chambersburg, Pennsylvania – December 10, 1914 in Washington, D.C.) was an American archer who competed in the early twentieth century. He won two silver medals in Archery at the 1904 Summer Olympics in Missouri in the double york and American rounds. In the team competition he won the gold medal.

Williams is one of several U.S. Olympic competitors to have fought in the American Civil War and competed in archery in the 1904 Olympics, along with Confederate veteran Will H Thompson of the 4th Georgia Infantry and Union veteran William A Clark of the 48th Ohio. Williams served in the 54th Ohio Infantry Regiment as a colonel.

References

External links
 

1841 births
1914 deaths
American male archers
Olympic gold medalists for the United States in archery
Olympic silver medalists for the United States in archery
Archers at the 1904 Summer Olympics
Sportspeople from Pennsylvania
Medalists at the 1904 Summer Olympics
Union Army colonels
People of Ohio in the American Civil War
Military personnel from Ohio
Military personnel from Pennsylvania
Deaths from pneumonia in Washington, D.C.
People from Chambersburg, Pennsylvania